Felix Hervè Talbot Bowness (30 March 1922 – 13 September 2009) was a British comedy actor who was best remembered for his portrayal of the jockey Fred Quilley in the BBC sitcom Hi-de-Hi!.

Biography
Born in the village of Harwell, Berkshire, to French Canadian parents, he became a bantamweight boxing champion.

Second World War
At the outbreak of the Second World War, he joined the Royal Berkshire Regiment as a signalman. At the D-Day landings in Normandy, after his landing craft was hit and sunk, he only remembered waking in a French convent. During recovery he attended a Vera Lynn concert, after which she gave him a singing lesson.

Performing career
Bowness returned to Britain and started performing on the comedy circuit, undertaking two summer seasons at Clacton-on-Sea Pier in 1948 and 1949.

He eventually broke into films and television in the early 1960s, and supplemented his income by becoming a well used warm-up act for television shows including Morecambe and Wise, Home To Roost, The Two Ronnies and, later. Sir Terry Wogan's chat show Wogan and Noel's House Party. He was also the warm-up act for This Is Your Life and became the subject of it in 1985.

Bowness did not come to mainstream public attention until he was picked up by the writing partnership of Jimmy Perry and David Croft. He was cast as former jockey Fred Quilley in the sitcom Hi-de-Hi! and appeared in all 58 episodes. He subsequently appeared with the same ensemble cast in You Rang, M'Lord? and Oh, Doctor Beeching!. During his career he also had credits in such comedy series as The Benny Hill Show, The Liver Birds, The Goodies, Dad's Army, Porridge, Sykes Till Death Us Do Part  and Are You Being Served?.

Bowness was not known for cinematic roles, but in 1979 he appeared in the soft-porn film Queen of the Blues starring Mary Millington and Milton Reid.

Personal life and death
Bowness and Mavis, his wife of 59 years, lived in Woodley, Reading. They had a son, Robert, three grandchildren, Jonathan, David and Christopher, and two great-granddaughters, Faith and Evie. He retired from acting in 2003 after being diagnosed with dementia. He died of cancer in 2009, at the age of 87.

Television roles

References

External links

Obituary in The Guardian
Obituary in The Independent

1922 births
2009 deaths
Military personnel from Berkshire
English people of Canadian descent
English male boxers
Royal Berkshire Regiment soldiers
British Army personnel of World War II
English male comedians
English male television actors
Actors from Reading, Berkshire
Deaths from cancer in England